M. K. Vishnu Prasad is an Indian politician from Tamil Nadu, India. He is the working president of Tamil Nadu Congress Committee of Indian National Congress party. He was a former Tamil Nadu Youth Congress President for the year 2003.He is the son of M. Krishnasamy.

Political career
Dr M K Vishnu Prasad was the organizing Secretary of Tamilnadu Youth Congress

He was the President - Tamilnadu Youth Congress ( PYC - Pradesh Youth Congress) from 2003 to 2006. During his tenure as the President of PYC - Tamilnadu, he toured the entire state of Tamilnadu several times to connect with the youth and grassroot workers. He conducted many rallies and agitations for the cause of the people.

Dr M. K. Vishnu Prasad was elected as a Member of the Legislative Assembly to the 13th Tamil Nadu Legislative Assembly from Cheyyar constituency in Tiruvannamalai district of Tamil Nadu,  from 2006-2011 .

During his period as a MLA of Cheyyar Constituency, he was instrumental in establishing the Cheyyar SIPCOT Industrial park, which now provides employment to over 30000 people .

He got sanctioned the much awaited Cheyyar Bye -Pass and constructed the Ocheri bridge which was a long pending dream of the people of that area.

He was the pioneer in conducting the rural T20 cricket under the name of Shri Rajiv Gandhi Memorial Cricket Tournament to tap the cricketing talents of the rural youth of his Cheyyar Constituency.  Shri K Srikanth - Former Captain - Indian Cricket Team presided over the finals and gave away the trophies and certificates.

In 2010 he organized a mass guidance camp under the name of Shri Rajiv Gandhi Higher Education Guidance Camp for the 12th Std students to enrich their knowledge on the wide world of opportunities available before them to choose and shape their career. This camp was inaugurated by Shri M Rajendran IAS, the District  Collector of Thiruvannamalai district with a special guidance address by Dr V Iraianbu IAS

He contested the 2019 Indian general election from Arani (Lok Sabha constituency) as an Indian National Congress candidate in Arani constituency of Tamil Nadu. and was elected as a Member of Parliament to the 17th Lok Sabha.

He is the Working President - Tamilnadu Congress committee.

References

1976 births
Living people
Tamil Nadu politicians
Indian National Congress politicians from Tamil Nadu
India MPs 2019–present
Tamil Nadu MLAs 2006–2011